HGD, or hgd, may refer to:

Medical science 
 Hymenoptera Genome Database, a resource supporting the genomics of Hymenoptera
 Homogentisate 1,2-dioxygenase, an enzyme which catalyzes the conversion of homogentisate to 4-maleylacetoacetate
 2-hydroxymethylglutarate dehydrogenase (HgD), an enzyme belonging to the family of oxidoreductases

Transport 
 HGD, the Amtrak code for Huntingdon (Amtrak station), Pennsylvania, United States
 HGD, the IATA code for Hughenden Airport, Queensland, Australia
 HGD, the ICAO code for Hangard Airlines, a defunct Mongolian airline
 HGD, the National Rail code for Hungerford railway station in the county of Berkshire, UK

See also